Gulickia is a genus of gastropod in the family Achatinellidae.

It contains the following species:
 Gulickia alexandri

References 

Achatinellidae
Taxonomy articles created by Polbot